Tasmanian Magpies are an Australian netball team that represents Tasmania in the Australian Netball League. They were ANL champions in 2018. The team was formed in 2017 as a partnership between Netball Tasmania, the Tasmanian Government and Collingwood Magpies. Tasmanian Magpies are effectively the reserve team of Collingwood Magpies.

History

Tasmanian Spirit
Netball Tasmania previously operated a team in the Australian Netball League between 2008 and 2015. It initially simply played as Tasmania but subsequently played as Tasmanian Spirit or Tassie Spirit.

New team
In 2017 Netball Tasmania, the Tasmanian Government and Collingwood Magpies formed a three-year partnership to enter a new team in the Australian Netball League. In February 2020 the partnership was renewed for a further two years.

ANL Grand finals
In 2018 with a team that included Melissa Bragg, Gabrielle Sinclair, Cody Lange and  Kelsie Rainbow, Tasmanian Magpies reached and won their first ANL grand final in just their second season.

Home venues
Tasmanian Magpies play the majority of their home matches at various venues in Melbourne. During the 2017 season they played their home games at Hisense Arena. On 18 February 2017 they made their Australian Netball League debut with a 51–44 home win against Victorian Fury. The game was part of a double header which also featured the 2017 Suncorp Super Netball Round 1 match between Collingwood Magpies and Melbourne Vixens. During the 2018 season they played home matches at the State Netball and Hockey Centre and the Margaret Court Arena. They also played two matches in Tasmania. In June 2018 they defeated Queensland Fusion in two matches played at the Silverdome in Launceston. During the 2019 season they played home matches at the Hobart Netball and Sports Centre and Bendigo Stadium.

Notable players

2020 squad

  
 

Notes
  Brooke Allan, Nyah Allen, Sharni Lambden and Emma Ryde are Collingwood Magpies training partners.

Collingwood Magpies
 Melissa Bragg
 Molly Jovic
 Cody Lange
 Kelsie Rainbow
 Gabrielle Sinclair

Head coaches

Premierships
Australian Netball League
Winners: 2018: 1

References

 
Netball in Tasmania
Netball teams in Australia
 
Collingwood Magpies Netball
Australian Netball League teams
Netball
Sports clubs established in 2017
2017 establishments in Australia